Kaole is a national historic site located in Bagamoyo District of Pwani Region in Tanzania. The site is located three miles east of the historic city of Bagamoyo on the Indian Ocean coast. The area contains old Swahili coral stone ruins dating to a period between the 13th century and the 16th century. Some of the ruins date back to the 13th century and consist of two mosques and 30 tombs.

The tombs at Kaole were built from coral stones with stone pillars that marked some of the tombs. According to local tradition, some of the tombs are the graves of local rulers who were known as "diwanis". "Diwanis" are believed to be the descendants of the Sheikh Ali Muhamad al-Hatim al-Barawi. A small museum has been established, where some artifacts are exposed that were found in the ruins. Some of these artifacts are Chinese and thus provide evidence of ancient commercial relationships.

History

Kaole was originally settled in the 8th century as a trading town. Mangrove poles, sandalwood, ebony and ivory would have been the main trading items. The dwellings of the Kaole people were mostly constructed of wood, making them less durable than the stone mosques and tombs. Later on, the Zaramo people in the area called the place Kaole, meaning "go and see". The first to study the Kaole Ruins was the British archaeologist Neville Chittick, around 1958.

See also
Historic Swahili Settlements

References

Archaeological sites in Tanzania
Buildings and structures in the Pwani Region
Bagamoyo District
Populated places established in the 8th century
Swahili people
Swahili city-states
Swahili culture
Archaeological sites of Eastern Africa